Streptomyces mutomycini is a bacterium species from the genus of Streptomyces which has been isolated from soil. Streptomyces mutomycini produces mutamycin. Cultures of different strains of S. hygroscopicus can be used to produce a number of chemical compounds or enzymes.

See also 
 List of Streptomyces species

References

Further reading

External links
Type strain of Streptomyces mutomycini at BacDive -  the Bacterial Diversity Metadatabase	

mutomycini
Bacteria described in 1986